Protective Life Corporation is a financial service holding company in Birmingham, Alabama. The company's primary subsidiary, Protective Life Insurance Company, was established in 1907 and now markets its products and services in all 50 states. As of December 31, 2022, the corporation had more than 3,700 employees, annual revenues of $6.6 billion and assets of $113.2 billion. In addition to Protective Life Insurance Company, Protective Life Corporation's subsidiaries include West Coast Life Insurance Company, MONY Life Insurance Company, Protective Life And Annuity Insurance Company, ProEquities Inc./Protective Securities, and Protective Property and Casualty Insurance Company.

History
Protective Life Insurance Company was founded in 1907 and paid its first death claim in 1909.

In 1927, Protective merged with Alabama National Insurance Company, and Alabama National's president, Samuel Clabaugh, became the president of the combined companies which continued to do business as Protective.

In 1937, Clabaugh turned over the leadership of the company to Col. William J. Rushton, and in 1969, Col. Rushton's son, William “Billy” J. Rushton III, became president of Protective. The younger Rushton then presided over a series of acquisitions that led Protective into all 50 states. As part of this push, Drayton Nabers Jr. became CEO in 1992 and in 1993, Protective Life Corporation was listed on the New York Stock Exchange under the ticker symbol PL.

In 1997, Protective Life acquired West Coast Life. Nabers retired in 2002 and Harvard Business School graduate John D. Johns was then named president and CEO of Protective Life. John D. Johns served as president and chief executive officer until 2017 and as chairman of the board from January 2003 to November 2019. Johns has been a director since May 1997 and an employee of the company and its subsidiaries since 1993.

In 2007, Protective Life celebrated its 100th anniversary, just one year after its acquisition of Chase Insurance Group in 2006.

In 2013, Protective's principal subsidiary, Protective Life Insurance Company, completed the acquisition of MONY Life Insurance Company and reinsured certain policies of MONY Life Insurance Company of America. The total transaction price was $1.06 billion.

On July 1, 2017, Rich Bielen became Protective's 7th president and chief executive officer. He joined Protective in 1991 with responsibility for the company's securities portfolio and became chief investment officer and treasurer in 2002. He became vice chairman and chief financial officer in 2007. 

In January 2016, Bielen was named president and chief operating officer. On June 1, 2019, Protective closed its largest transaction to date to acquire via reinsurance substantially all of the individual life and annuity business of Great-West Life & Annuity Insurance Company. The acquisition represented an estimated capital investment of approximately $1.20 billion.

Protective Life has offices in Alabama, California, Illinois, Missouri, Nebraska, New Hampshire, Ohio and Tennessee.

Protective Life Corporation was acquired by The Dai-ichi Life Insurance Company, Limited (Tokyo, Japan) on February 15, 2015.

Leadership and board of directors
Protective Life Corporation leadership includes Richard J. Bielen (President and CEO), Mike Temple (Vice Chairman and Chief Operating Officer), Scott Adams (EVP, Chief Digital Innovation Officer), Mark Drew (EVP, General Counsel and Secretary), Nancy Kane (EVP, Acquisitions and Corporate Development), Carl S. Thigpen (EVP and CIO), Steven G. Walker (EVP and CFO) and Wendy Evesque (SVP and CHRO).

The company's board of directors includes W. Michael Warren, Jr., Richard J. Bielen, John J. McMahon, Jr. Jesse J. Spikes, Norimitsu Kawahara, Tetsuya Kikuta, Vanessa Leonard, Toshiaki Sumino, Ungyong Shu and William A. Terry.  

The board of Protective Life Corporation (“PLC”) is composed of eight directors, four of whom are affiliated with the Company and its subsidiaries, and four who are independent. The independent directors are Neal Goldman (Chairman),Kenneth Lerer, Richard Levy, Robert Shaw Read more

Operations
The company offers plans in:

Life insurance, including universal life, variable universal life, and bank-owned life insurance products offered through a network of brokers, stockbrokers and independent marketing organizations.
Annuities, including fixed and variable annuity products sold through broker-dealers, financial institutions and brokers.
Stable value products, including fixed and floating-rate funding agreements sold to the trustees of municipal bond proceeds, institutional investors, bank trust departments and money market funds.
Asset protection, marketing extended service contracts and credit life and disability insurance to protect consumers’ investments in automobiles, watercraft and recreational vehicles.
Acquisitions, consisting of policies originated by other companies and later acquired by Protective. The segment's primary focus is on life insurance policies and annuity products that were sold to individuals.

Sponsorships

In April 2019, Protective Life was announced as the naming sponsor for a 47,000-seat football stadium on the grounds of the Birmingham–Jefferson Convention Complex that opened on October 2, 2021. Protective Stadium is new home for UAB Blazers football, replacing Legion Field.

Philanthropy
The company established the Protective Life Foundation, which supports education and healthy development of at-risk youth. In addition, the foundation engages charitable activities to cultural organizations, civic and community initiatives, human services groups, and the United Way.

References

External links
Protective Life's Website

Companies based in Birmingham, Alabama
Companies formerly listed on the New York Stock Exchange
Dai-ichi Life
Life insurance companies of the United States
Financial services companies established in 1907
1907 establishments in Alabama
2015 mergers and acquisitions
American subsidiaries of foreign companies